María Mercedes or Maria Mercedes may refer to:

Television
María Mercedes (Mexican TV series), a Mexican telenovela starring the actress Thalía
Maria Mercedes (Philippine TV series), a Philippine remake based on the Mexican telenovela

People
Mercedes of Orléans, "María de las Mercedes d'Orléans y Borbón" (1860–1878), queen consort of Spain
Mercedes, Princess of Asturias, "Infanta Maria de las Mercedes" (1880–1904), heiress-presumptive of Spain
Maria Mercedes (actress), Australian actress
María Mercedes, an athlete from the Dominican Republic; for further information, see 1997 Central American and Caribbean Championships in Athletics

Mercedes, Maria